Amaxia egaensis is a moth of the family Erebidae. It was described by Seitz in 1921. It is found in Brazil.

References

Moths described in 1921
Amaxia
Moths of South America